The Wittenburg Door, sometimes known as simply The Door, was a Christian satire and humor magazine, previously published bimonthly by the non-profit Trinity Foundation based in Dallas, Texas. The magazine started publication in 1971 and ceased publication in 2008. It was then published only online by John Bloom until its recent transition to a new group of "door keepers". The title was a reference to the Ninety-Five Theses written by Martin Luther in 1517 that he is believed to have posted on the door of the All Saints' Church, Wittenberg. A documentary, Nailin' it to the Church, by Murray Stiller was made in 2009.

References

External links 
  of first website
 

Alternative magazines
American comedy websites
Bimonthly magazines published in the United States
Defunct political magazines published in the United States
Humor magazines
Magazines established in 1971
Magazines disestablished in 2008
Magazines published in Texas
Mass media in Dallas
Religious comedy websites
Satirical magazines published in the United States